Come Summer is a Broadway musical with a book and lyrics by Will Holt and music by David Baker, based on Rainbow on the Road by Esther Forbes and vocal arrangements by Trude Rittmann. The original Broadway production opened on March 18, 1969 at the Lunt-Fontanne Theatre starring, Ray Bolger, Leonard John Crofoot, David Cryer, Cathryn Damon, Margaret Hamilton, and Barbara Sharma. Directed by Agnes de Mille it closed after 7 performances on March 22, 1969. Despite its short run, David Cryer won the 1969 Theatre World Award.

The story tells of an itinerant peddlar in 19th century New England, and the people whose lives he affects.

Behind the scenes, the musical was a disaster.  Ray Bolger demanded that the producers expand his role; several rewrites later, de Mille herself was fired and replaced by Burt Shevelove.  Only a few days after that, Shevelove exited, and "the producers asked Agnes to come back, but only to choreograph."  De Mille's assistant director, James Mitchell, turned down the director's chair, but became the de facto director anyway.  As a result, "neither she [de Mille] nor anyone else could say who directed the show."  Come Summer turned out to be de Mille's final Broadway production.

Songs 

Act I		 
Good Time Charlie - Phineas and Peddlers
Think Spring - Phineas, Jude, Mrs. Meserve, Sheriff and Populace
Wild Birds Calling - Jude and Mitty
Goodbye, My Bachelor - Phineas, Jude and Populace
Fine, Thank You, Fine - Emma
Road to Hampton - Jude
Come Summer - Phineas, Jude, Mitty and Visions of Lovers
Let Me Be - Mitty and Jude
Feather in My Shoe - Phineas
The Loggers' Song - Phineas, Jude, Loggers and Populace
	 		 
Act II		 
Faucett Falls Fancy - Phineas and Populace
Rockin' - Emma and Jude
Skin and Bones - Phineas
Jude's Holler - Jude and Populace
Moonglade - Phineas, Jude, Mitty, Emma, Dorinda and Populace
Women - Mitty
No - Phineas and Populace
So Much World - Jude

References

External links
 

1969 musicals
Broadway musicals
Musicals based on novels